Marino pole is a village in Petrich Municipality, in Blagoevgrad Province, Bulgaria. The Greek name of village is "Μαρινούπολις" (Marinoupolis).

References

Villages in Blagoevgrad Province